Michael Büskens (born 19 March 1968) is a German former football player who played as a midfielder and a football manager. He is currently the assistant head coach of Bundesliga club Schalke 04.

During a 14-year professional career, he appeared in nearly 400 Bundesliga games, mainly representing Schalke 04 (11 years) and later also briefly managing the latter.

Playing career

Büskens began his career with his hometown team Alemannia Düsseldorf before moving to city giants Fortuna. After five years, he moved to VfL Benrath, returning in 1987 to Fortuna, this time as member of the professional squad, and rarely missed one top-division game during his three-year spell, although ended in relegation.

In 1992, Büskens moved to FC Schalke 04, where he had the most successful years of his career. He was part of the UEFA Cup and German Cup 2001 and 2002 winning squads and never appeared in less than 27 league games in his first seven seasons. In the European conquest of 1997, he played in 10 matches (eight complete), including both legs of the final against Inter Milan.

In January 2000, Büskens spent half a season at MSV Duisburg, returning to Schalke after a poor season. He continued to play for the team until 2003, splitting between the first and second squads in his last year, also being assistant manager of the latter.

Managerial career

Schalke 04
In 2005, Büskens succeeded Gerhard Kleppinger as manager of the second squad. On 13 April 2008, he was appointed caretaker manager of Schalke's first team, alongside another former club player, Youri Mulder, succeeding Mirko Slomka after a 1–5 away loss to Werder Bremen, as the team was battling for a UEFA Champions League position (eventually reaching third).

Büskens remained in charge until the end of the season, being replaced by Fred Rutten in July 2008. He finished the stint with a record of five wins and a draw. However, in March 2009, the latter was fired, which led to the pair again taking over the side until the end of the season (now accompanied by another former Schalke player, Oliver Reck), being then replaced by Felix Magath, and released by the club on 23 June 2009. He finished his second stint with a record of four wins, one draw and four losses.

Greuther Fürth
Büskens was named manager of 2. Bundesliga club Greuther Fürth on 27 December 2009. Under his management, Fürth gained promotion to the Bundesliga for the first time in the club's history in 2012. Büskens was sacked on 20 February 2013. He finished with a record of 50 wins, 33 draws and 33 losses.

Fortuna Düsseldorf

Büskens was named manager of Fortuna Düsseldorf on 4 June 2013. His first match was a 1–0 win against Energie Cottbus. Büskens picked Fabian Giefer to start the match instead of Michael Rensing. Rensing refused to be a substitute and left the stadium and went home. Robin Heller subsequently took the substitutes bench. Büskens was sacked on 30 November 2013, a day after a 2–0 loss to Karlsruher SC. He finished with a record of five wins, four draws and eight losses.

Return to Greuther Fürth
Büskens was hired for the second time on 23 February 2015. His first match was a 2–1 loss against 1. FC Kaiserslautern on 27 February 2015. Then on 7 March 2015, Fürth and VfR Aalen finished in a 1–1 draw. In a Bavarian derby on 13 March 2015, Fürth lost 3–0 to 1860 München. Büskens resigned on 28 May 2015. He finished with a record of two wins, four draws and six losses.

Rapid Wien
Büskens was hired by Rapid Wien on 7 June 2016. He signed a one-year contract with an option. He replaced Zoran Barisic. His first training session was on 10 June 2016.

On 7 November 2016, Büskens was relieved of his duties.

Return to Schalke 04
Büskens returned to Schalke on 14 March 2019 as an assistant manager.

On 7 March 2022, after the dismissal of Dimitrios Grammozis, he took over the team as head coach on an interim basis until the end of the 2021–22 season. Schalke won the 2. Bundesliga title after winning eight out of nine games under Büskens' management.

Managerial statistics

Honours

Player
Fortuna Düsseldorf
2. Bundesliga: 1988–89

Schalke 04
UEFA Cup: 1996–97
DFB-Pokal: 2000–01, 2001–02

Manager
Greuther Fürth
2. Bundesliga: 2011–12

Schalke 04
2. Bundesliga: 2021–22

References

External links

 

1968 births
Living people
German footballers
German football managers
Association football midfielders
Bundesliga players
2. Bundesliga players
Fortuna Düsseldorf players
FC Schalke 04 players
MSV Duisburg players
UEFA Cup winning players
Bundesliga managers
2. Bundesliga managers
Austrian Football Bundesliga managers
German expatriate football managers
FC Schalke 04 managers
FC Schalke 04 II players
SpVgg Greuther Fürth managers
SK Rapid Wien managers
German expatriate sportspeople in Austria
Footballers from Düsseldorf
West German footballers